Patricio Andrés Jeria Alvarado (born 10 September 1989) is a Chilean footballer. 

He played for (then) Chilean Primera B side Lota Schwager as centre back.

External links
 Patricio Jeria at Football Lineups
 

1989 births
Living people
Primera B de Chile players
Chilean footballers
Lota Schwager footballers
Deportes Concepción (Chile) footballers
Association football central defenders